Thomas Mackie may refer to:

 Thomas Mackie (politician) (1840–1905), lumber merchant and political figure in Ontario, Canada
 Thomas J. Mackie (1888–1955), Scottish bacteriologist
 Thomas Rockwell Mackie, medical physicist
 Thomas T. Mackie, research/public health physician in the United States Army during World War II